Uxu may refer to:

 uXu, Underground eXperts United
 UXU Ranch, a historic dude ranch in Wyoming
 Uxu, Tibet, a village in Tibet